Andrea Robert Paoli is a Lebanese athlete who was the Taekwondo champion of Lebanon in the senior category for five consecutive seasons.

Biography
In 2007, she won the Lebanese Juniors championship and later in the year, she earned the bronze medal at the Asian Juniors championship. This medal led to her being selected to take part in the Youth Olympic Camp that took place during the Beijing Olympic Games. She won a bronze medal at the 2010 Asian Games and in 2011, she was ranked eighth in the world. Paoli was able to qualify to the London Olympics by ranking second the Asian Olympic Qualifiers that took place in Thailand in 2011.

She represented Lebanon in Taekwondo at the 2012 Summer Olympics held in London.  She was given the honor of carrying the flag for Lebanon during the Parade of Nations.  During the Women's 57 kg event, she advanced from the preliminary round to the quarterfinals by defeating Nidia Munoz of Cuba.  In the quarterfinals, she lost against Tseng Li-Cheng of Chinese Taipei.

Family
Her brother, Philippe, is a former professional footballer. Her father, Robert, was a basketball player.

References

1992 births
Living people
Sportspeople from Beirut
Lebanese people of Greek descent
Lebanese people of Italian descent
Lebanese female taekwondo practitioners
Taekwondo practitioners at the 2012 Summer Olympics
Olympic taekwondo practitioners of Lebanon
Asian Games medalists in taekwondo
Taekwondo practitioners at the 2010 Asian Games
Lebanese Christians
Asian Games bronze medalists for Lebanon
Mediterranean Games bronze medalists for Lebanon
Competitors at the 2013 Mediterranean Games
Medalists at the 2010 Asian Games
Mediterranean Games medalists in taekwondo